The Radivoj Korać Cup is the men's national basketball cup of Serbia. It is run by the Basketball Federation of Serbia and is named after a Serbian basketball legend and FIBA Hall of Fame and Basketball Hall of Fame member Radivoj Korać.

Belgrade-based club Crvena zvezda have the most cup titles at 9.

History

In 2003, the Cup got its name on proposal from Hemofarm, due to the abolition of the eponymous European competition and the name change of the Federal Republic of Yugoslavia into the State Union of Serbia and Montenegro. After the separation of Serbia and Montenegro in 2006, the Cup has become the national cup in Serbia.

According to the agreement from 2011 between the Basketball Federation of Serbia (KSS) and FIBA, KSS supported to give the original replica of the trophy of the FIBA Korać Cup to a national cup winner in Serbia. So this trophy (named Žućkova levica) was first awarded to the Cup winner in 2013.

Title holders 

Serbia and Montenegro
 2002–03 FMP 
 2003–04 Crvena zvezda 
 2004–05 FMP (Reflex)
 2005–06 Crvena zvezda 
Serbia
 2006–07 FMP  
 2007–08 Partizan 
 2008–09 Partizan 
 2009–10 Partizan 
 2010–11 Partizan 
 2011–12 Partizan 
 2012–13 Crvena zvezda 
 2013–14 Crvena zvezda 
 2014–15 Crvena zvezda 
 2015–16 Mega Basket (Mega Leks)
 2016–17 Crvena zvezda
 2017–18 Partizan
 2018–19 Partizan
 2019–20 Partizan
 2020–21 Crvena zvezda 
 2021–22 Crvena zvezda
 2022–23 Crvena zvezda

Finals
Source

Performance by club

All-time participants
The following is a list of clubs who have played in the Radivoj Korać Cup at any time since its formation in 2002 to the current season.

Notes

Participants from Montenegro (2003–2006)

Honours
Most Valuable Player Award
The winning head coaches

See also
 Basketball Cup of Serbia
 Basketball League of Serbia

References

External links
 Basketball Federation of Serbia 

 
Basketball cup competitions in Serbia
Basketball cup competitions in Europe
Basketball competitions in Serbia and Montenegro
Recurring sporting events established in 2002
2002 establishments in Yugoslavia